Detroit Plateau is a major interior plateau of Graham Land on the Antarctic Peninsula, with heights between . The plateau was observed from the air by Sir Hubert Wilkins on a flight of December 20, 1928. Wilkins named it Detroit Aviation Society Plateau after the society which aided in the organizing of his expedition, but the shortened form of the original name is approved. The north and east sides of the plateau were charted by the Falkland Islands Dependencies Survey in 1946–47.

Dinsmoor Glacier flows east from the south edge of Detroit Plateau.

Central plateaus of Graham Land
North to south:
 Laclavère Plateau
 Louis Philippe Plateau
 Detroit Plateau
 Herbert Plateau
 Foster Plateau
 Forbidden Plateau
 Bruce Plateau
 Avery Plateau
 Hemimont Plateau

Further reading 
 Damien Gildea, Antarctic Peninsula - Mountaineering in Antarctica: Travel Guide
 Mariusz Potocki, Paul A. Mayewski, Andrei V.Kurbatov, Jefferson C. Simões, Daniel A. Dixon, Ian Goodwin, Andrew M. Carleton, Michael J. Handley, Ricardo Jaña, Elena V. Korotkikh, Recent increase in Antarctic Peninsula ice core uranium concentrations, Atmospheric Environment Volume 140, September 2016, Pages 381–385, https://doi.org/10.1016/j.atmosenv.2016.06.010

References 

Plateaus of Antarctica
Landforms of Graham Land
Davis Coast
Nordenskjöld Coast